Major General Anton Muttukumaru, OBE, ED, ADC (6 July 1908 – 2001) was the first native Ceylonese  to serve as the Commander of the Ceylon Army (now Sri Lankan Army), a post he held from 1955 to 1959. He also served as Ceylon's High Commissioner to Australia, New Zealand, Pakistan and Ambassador to Egypt.

Early life and education
Born to Jaffna Tamil parents Dr Philip Marian Muttukumaru and Mary Mount Carmel Alles, he and his siblings were brought up by their mother after the early death of their father. Educated at home by an English governess and then at St. Joseph's College, Colombo, he then entered Ceylon University College and in 1928, he left for Jesus College, Oxford to read Philosophy, Politics and Economics. After completing his degree, he read for the Bar and was called by Gray's Inn to become a barrister. He returned to Ceylon, took his oaths as an Advocate of the Supreme Court of Ceylon and started his legal practice.

Military career

Ceylon Defence Force
After returning from England, in 1934 he joined the Ceylon Defence Force, a part-time reserve force raised by the British to defend the island. Muttukumaru was commissioned as a second lieutenant in the Ceylon Light Infantry (CLI) on 11 September 1934. In 1939 he was mobilised with the rest of the CDF at the outset of World War II. During this time, he would go on to command the CLI Guard at the South East Asia Command headquarters in Kandy and was promoted captain on 29 November 1940 and major in 1942. On 1 November 1943 he was promoted lieutenant colonel and appointed commanding officer, 2nd Battalion CLI, in which appointment he continued to serve until the general demobilisation which took place after the end of the war in January 1947. He led Ceylon's contingent in the London victory parade in 1946.

Following the war, Muttukumaru worked once again as a lawyer representing the Attorney General, in a variety of cases but soon gave up law to function as Officer in Charge, Administration in the Ceylon Defence Force Headquarters, where he assisted in the initial plans for the formation of a new Ceylon Army, including the drafting of the Army Act.

Ceylon army
When the Ceylon Army was formed in 1949, he was one of three lieutenant colonels commissioned into the regular force with the serial no O/50001. There he served as the Chief of Staff to Brigadier the Earl of Caithness. During this time he attended the Senior Officers' School, where he was taught by Field Marshal Montgomery and befriended future Israeli Defence Minister, Brigadier Moshe Dayan. He led the Ceylon contingent of soldiers to London on ceremonial duties for the funeral of George VI in 1952, and for the Queen's coronation. There his men mounted guard at Buckingham Palace. He was subsequently attached to the British Army in  West Germany, serving at the Headquarters of the British Army of the Rhine.

On 1 January 1954, he was promoted to the rank of colonel and took over as commanding officer of the 1 Battalion, Ceylon Light Infantry and Officer Commanding Troops, Panagoda. Under his command the battalion undertook its first live fire exercise Ex TYRO. On 19 July 1954, he was appointed aide-de-camp to the Queen. On 8 February 1955, he relinquished command of the Ceylon Light Infantry.

Army Commander 
On 9 February 1955, he was promoted to the rank of Brigadier and appointed first Ceylonese Army Commander. This took place while he was at attending the Imperial Defence College, Colonel Wijeyekoon who was the chief of staff, served as acting army commander until his return in 1956 when he assumed command of the army. On 1 January 1958, he was promoted to the rank of Major General, becoming the first army officer to hold the rank. During his time as commander, the army grew in size and was deployed on several occasions to curb civil unrest and riots. He elevated the Army Recruit Training Depot at Diyatalawa to the Army Training Centre, raised a new infantry battalion, Ceylon Sinha Regiment, promoted all commanding officer to the rank of lieutenant colonel after elevating all regular units to regimental strength; established the Headquarters of the Ceylon Volunteer Force and initiated the concept of regional commands. In 1959, he decided to retire so that younger officers could have their chance to command, even though Prime Minister Solomon Bandaranaike asked him to stay on.

Later years
After leaving the army, Muttukumaru was appointed Ceylon's High Commissioner to Pakistan (with concurrent responsibility for Afghanistan, Iran and Iraq) in 1959, and High Commissioner to Australia and New Zealand from 1963 to 1966. Later in 1966, Muttukumaru became Ambassador to Egypt, concurrently he was Ambassador to Jordan, the Sudan and Yugoslavia. He permanently retired in 1969.

Honors and decorations 
During his service in the Ceylon Defence Force, he received the King George V Silver Jubilee Medal in 1935, appointed an officer of the Order of the British Empire (Military Division) in the 1946 Birthday Honours and awarded the Efficiency Decoration. For wartime service, he had earned the Defence Medal and the War Medal 1939–1945 in 1945; for service in the Ceylon Army, he received the Ceylon Armed Services Inauguration Medal in 1955.

In 1996, the General Sir John Kotelawela Defence Academy awarded an 'Honourable Doctor of Letters' to him for his contributions to the buildup of the Army and for being the first to publish a short history of the Army, "The Military History of Ceylon – An Outline". General Muttukumaru died in Australia in 2001 at the age of 93.

Family
Muttukumaru married Margaret Vasanthi Ratnarajah in 1944. They had three sons: Anton Vasantha Muttukumaru, Philip Rajkantha Muttukumaru and Christopher Peter Jayantha Muttukumaru, CB, DL.

See also
 Sri Lankan Non Career Diplomats

References

External links
 Official Website of Sri Lanka Army
 First Ceylonese Commander of the Army
 Maj-Gen Anton Muttukumaru
 Muttukumaru ancestry
 Deserters are cowards, says first Sri Lankan Army Chief

1908 births
2001 deaths
Sri Lankan major generals
Ceylonese lieutenant colonels
Sri Lankan Tamil lawyers
Sri Lankan Tamil military personnel
High Commissioners of Sri Lanka to Australia
High Commissioners of Sri Lanka to New Zealand
High Commissioners of Sri Lanka to Pakistan
Ambassadors of Sri Lanka to Egypt
Ambassadors of Sri Lanka to Afghanistan
Ambassadors of Sri Lanka to Iran
Ambassadors of Sri Lanka to Iraq
Ambassadors of Sri Lanka to Jordan
Ambassadors of Sri Lanka to Sudan
Ambassadors of Sri Lanka to Yugoslavia
Australian people of Sri Lankan Tamil descent
Sri Lankan diplomats
Tamil people
Sri Lankan emigrants to Australia
Sri Lankan Roman Catholics
Ceylonese Officers of the Order of the British Empire
British Army personnel of World War II
Ceylon Light Infantry officers
Alumni of the Ceylon University College
Alumni of Jesus College, Oxford
Members of Gray's Inn
Sri Lankan barristers
Ceylonese advocates
Ceylonese military personnel of World War II
Alumni of Saint Joseph's College, Colombo
Graduates of the Royal College of Defence Studies